Eesergroen is a village in the Dutch province of Drenthe. It is a part of the municipality of Borger-Odoorn, and lies about 16 km northwest of Emmen.

The village was first mentioned in 1942 as "Eesergroen of Eesgroen", and means "trees belonging to Ees. In 1882, the first house was built to cultivate the wilderness. In 1930, a canal was dug and the large scale cultivation of the area started.

In 1917, the Maranatha chapel was built by the Rechtzinnig Hervormde Kerk, a Christian fundamentalist congregation. It was decommissioned in 1975 and is now used by an auto workshop. In 1956, a church was built by the Vrijzinnig Hervormde Kerk, a liberal Christianity congregation. It was decommissioned in 1969, and now serves as a holiday home.

References

Populated places in Drenthe
Borger-Odoorn
1882 establishments in the Netherlands